Saeeda Imtiaz is a model and actress.

Personal life 
She was born in the United Arab Emirates and raised in New York, United States.

Career 
Imtiaz worked as a model, both in shows and in photo shoots, starting in 2013 and finishing in 2018.

In 2012, Imtiaz filmed a bilingual Pakistani film, Kaptaan: The Making of a Legend which was shot in Pakistan. Imtiaz portrays Jemima Khan, the ex-wife of Imran Khan.

Imtiaz was featured in Wajood, a Pakistani  film directed and produced by Javed Sheikh released in June 2018.

Filmography

References

External links 
 
 
Official Twitter

Living people
Pakistani female models
Pakistani film actresses
Stony Brook University alumni
21st-century Pakistani actresses
Year of birth missing (living people)